Acetofilamentum is a genus in the phylum Bacteroidota (Bacteria).

Etymology
The name Acetofilamentum derives from:Latin noun acetum, vinegar; Latin neuter gender noun filamentum, a spun thread; New Latin neuter gender noun Acetofilamentum, an acetate-producing, filamentous, threadlike bacterium.

Species
The genus contains  single species, namely A. rigidum ( Dietrich et al. 1989,  (Type species of the genus).; Latin neuter gender adjective rigidum, stiff, rigid.)

See also
 Bacterial taxonomy
 Microbiology

References 

Bacteria genera
Bacteroidia
Monotypic bacteria genera